Antonieta Galleguillos-Manque (born 9 January 1990) is a judoka from Chile.

Bio
Antonieta begun with judo at age 13. She is perspective judoka who trains under Cuban Andrés González from 2005.

Judo
She won bronze medal at 2009 World Judo Juniors Championships in Paris. It was first world judo medal for Chile in history.

She already represented her country at 2007 World Judo Championships in Rio de Janeiro but lost both matches soon after beginning by ippon.

The year 2009 was successful for her. She won another bronze at Pan American Judo Championships in Buenos Aires.

Her dream is competing at Olympic Games in London

Achievements

References

External links
 
 

1990 births
Living people
Chilean female judoka
Judoka at the 2011 Pan American Games
Competitors at the 2010 South American Games
Pan American Games competitors for Chile
20th-century Chilean women
21st-century Chilean women